The 2012 Oklahoma wildfires were a series of wildfires which impacted areas throughout the state of Oklahoma. Starting earlier in the year, a widespread drought caused many areas to be exposed to wildfires.

Starting in late July and early August, the wildfires burned at least 52,000 acres, and destroyed at least 121 homes and businesses. A wildfire near Luther in Central Oklahoma destroyed about 50 homes and other buildings before getting under control on August 4. Governor of Oklahoma Mary Fallin declared a state of emergency on July 30 due to the drought and wildfires.

Although property damage was substantial, no human lives due to the fires were reported. This may have been because a number of threatened communities were evacuated before fires reached them.

Governor requests federal assistance
Governor Fallin submitted a major disaster request to FEMA on September 17, 2012, for the period July 28 - August 14, 2012. The request was for Federal assistance to three counties,  as well as statewide Hazard Mitigation. Joint Federal, State and local Preliminary Damage Assessments (PDAs) were conducted in the requested counties during September 18–24, 2012.  Based on the PDAs, FEMA concluded that,   "... the damage was not of such severity and magnitude as to be beyond the combined capabilities of the state and affected local governments," and thus Federal assistance was denied. Governor Fallin was informed of the decision on October 15, 2012.

Ongoing high winds have continued to affect Oklahoma. In Durant, high winds forced  the Union Pacific Railroad to shut down one of their main railways through the town. In late November, Oklahoma State University researchers said that the wildfires and the ongoing drought were responsible for over $400 million in damages, harvest loss, and livestock loss.

Additional fires

Glencoe fire
On August 4, 2012, a fire broke out near the community of Glencoe, in northern Payne County, Oklahoma that forced all of the residents to evacuate their homes. Unlike many of the fires, this blaze was blamed on human activity. Two companies had been conducting welding operations in the area, and were sued for damages. Outdoor welding was actually prohibited, because of a statewide burn ban that had gone into effect the previous day. He said it was the 20th straight day of triple-digit temperatures. Only a late wind change spared the town from being totally destroyed.

In 2016, a jury decided that, "... IPS Engineering L.L.C. was responsible for 30 percent of the damage the wildfire caused, and Global Pipeline Construction LLC was responsible for the other 70 percent." The two companies were ordered to pay 72 plaintiffs a total of $6.5 million in compensation. In addition, IPS had to pay $1 million in punitive damages, and GPC was fined $100,000.

Luther fire
Luther, Oklahoma, a town in Oklahoma County just  outside Oklahoma City, was severely damaged by a wildfire on August 3–4, 2012. The blazes covered  and destroyed 24 houses before the winds abated sufficiently to bring the fire under control. Making the firefighters' work harder, the fire shut down Luther's municipal water pumps, forcing all residents to evacuate their homes. Gov. Mary Fallin visited the scene shortly afterward and told reporters that it was, "devastating."

Police said later that they had received reports that a man was seen throwing burning newspapers from the back of a truck in the area, and were treating the cause as possible arson.

Mannford fire
A fire department spokesperson said that it was the largest wildfire in recent state history.

See also
 Texas-Oklahoma wildfires of 2005–06
 2010–13 Southern United States and Mexico drought
 2012–13 North American drought

Notes

References

Wildfires in Oklahoma
Oklahoma
Wildfires